Athidhi may refer to:

 Athidhi (2007 film), a 2007 Telugu action thriller film

People

 Aditi Rao Hydari, Indian actress